Danedevae (Danedebai) was a Dacian town.

Ancient sources

Ptolemy's Geographia

Tabula Peutingeriana

Etymology

History

Dacian town

Roman times

Archaeology

See also 
 Dacian davae
 List of ancient cities in Thrace and Dacia
 Dacia
 Roman Dacia

Notes

References

Ancient

Modern

Further reading

External links 

Dacian towns